Mehran Marri is the sixth son of Pakistani politician Khair Bakhsh Marri and the current leader of United Baloch Army (UBA) which is designated as terrorist organisation by Pakistan. The group is also classified as terrorist organisation by Switzerland. On 16 November 2017, Mehran Marri was arrested at Zurich Airport by Swiss immigration authorities. Shortly after his arrest, Mehran Marri was placed under lifetime ban on entry to Switzerland. Swiss authorities issued a chargesheet in which they stated that Mehran Marri is the head of United Baloch Army (UBA). The chargesheet further stated that "if Marri was to enter Switzerland and work with Brahamdagh Bugti to coordinate terrorist operations, it could jeopardize the internal security of Switzerland".

However, after some time, Marri was released and deported by the Swiss authorities from Switzerland. Marri currently resides in United Kingdom. Marri's brother Balach Marri was the head of Baloch liberation army (BLA), a global terrorist organisation, until his death in a NATO airstrike in Afghanistan. After Balach Marri's death, Hyrbyair Marri took control of the Baloch liberation army.

Mehran Marri was born in Kabul, Afghanistan, where his father spent time in exile. He along with his brother Hyrbyair live in England, while their brother Changez is chief of the Marri tribe and a politician in Pakistan.

See also
 Balochistan
 Changez Marri 
 Balach Marri
 Ghazan Marri
 Hyrbyair Marri
 Hamza Marri
 Brahamdagh Bugti

References

Baloch people
1973 births
Living people
Baloch nationalists
Pakistani emigrants to the United Kingdom
Marri family